The 1910 Yale Bulldogs football team represented Yale University in the 1910 college football season. The Bulldogs finished with a 6–2–2 record under first-year head coach Ted Coy.

Yale end John Kilpatrick was a consensus pick for the 1910 College Football All-America Team, and four other Yale players (quarterback Art Howe, halfback Fred J. Daly, tackle James W. "Jim" Scully, and a guard with the surname Morris) received first-team All-America honors from at least one selector in 1910.

Schedule

References

Yale
Yale Bulldogs football seasons
Yale Bulldogs football